Alisa Mitskog is an American politician who, as of 2017, sits in the North Dakota House of Representatives.

A chiropractor by profession, Mitskog has served in the North Dakota House of Representatives since 2015. She previously served on the Wahpeton, North Dakota city council.

References

Women state legislators in North Dakota
North Dakota city council members
American chiropractors
Living people
Year of birth missing (living people)
21st-century American politicians
21st-century American women politicians
Women city councillors in the United States
Democratic Party members of the North Dakota House of Representatives